New Way to Be Human is the second studio album by the band Switchfoot. It was released on March 11, 1999, under independent label re:think Records, which was distributed by Sparrow Records. The song "Only Hope" was featured in the movie A Walk To Remember, and the tracks "New Way to Be Human", "Something More (Augustine's Confession)", and "I Turn Everything Over" received substantial play on Christian radio. The song "Let That Be Enough" was featured in the Disney television movie Model Behavior and in the television series Dawson's Creek.

Book 
A book of the same name has also been written by producer Charlie Peacock. The intro to the book is written by Jon Foreman, Switchfoot's lead singer and songwriter.

Lyrical philosophy 
Both "Sooner or Later (Soren's Song)" and "Something More (Augustine's Confession)" are based upon the works of philosophers. "Something More" is based upon a series of books, known as Confessions, that were written by Augustine of Hippo. About "Sooner or Later", Jon Foreman has said: "Sooner or later we all have to deal with the frightening reality that there is much that is wrong in the world... This is Soren's song... These are his thoughts as best as I understand them," alluding to the philosophy of Danish Christian philosopher Søren Kierkegaard. The song also references Jean-Paul Sartre's idea that men are "condemned to be free".

Composition 
The songs are alternative rock/jangle pop based. "New Way to Be Human" has two keys: E major and C Major. "New Way to be Human" has been remixed once.

Track listing

Personnel 
Switchfoot
 Jon Foreman - vocals, guitar, piano, trumpet
 Chad Butler - drums, percussion
 Tim Foreman - bass, backing vocals

Additional musicians
 Tony Miracle - analog synth
 David Davidson - violin
 Bob Mason - cello
 Sam Levine - bass clarinet, flute
 Mike Haynes - trumpet
 Mark Douthit - tenor sax
 Charlie Peacock - orchestration

References

External links 
 Album lyrics
 New Way To Be Human music video
 Company Car music video

1999 albums
Albums produced by Charlie Peacock
Switchfoot albums